Chamaraja is a Assembly constituency in the city of Mysore, Karnataka state in India. The area hosts one of the 224 constituencies in the Karnataka Legislative Assembly of Karnataka a south state of India. Chamaraja is also part of Mysore Lok Sabha constituency. Mysore Palace, which is in Chamaraja area, is one of the famous tourist attractions, and is known for its Dussehra celebrations.

Members of Legislative Assembly
 1978: Kalastavadi Puttaswamy, Janata Party
 1978 (By Poll): B. N. Kengegowda, Indian National Congress (Indira)
 1983: H. Kempegowda, Janata Party
 1985: K. Kempere Gowda, Janata Party
 1986 (By Poll): P. M. Chikkaboraiah, Janata Party
 1989: K. Harsha Kumar Gowda, Indian National Congress
 1994: H. S. Shankaralingegowda, Bharatiya Janata Party
 1999: H. S. Shankaralingegowda, Bharatiya Janata Party
 2004: H. S. Shankaralingegowda, Bharatiya Janata Party
 2008: H. S. Shankaralingegowda, Bharatiya Janata Party
 2013: Vasu, Indian National Congress

See also
 Mysore South
 Mysore district
 Mysore Lok Sabha constituency
 List of constituencies of Karnataka Legislative Assembly

References

 

Assembly constituencies of Karnataka
Mysore district